Amblypsilopus is a genus of flies in the family Dolichopodidae. It is a large genus, with about 350 species recorded. However, it is possibly polyphyletic.

Species

 Amblypsilopus abruptus (Walker, 1859)
 Amblypsilopus acuminatus Tang, Zhu & Yang, 2019
 Amblypsilopus albicinctus (De Meijere, 1913)
 Amblypsilopus albifacies (Parent, 1931)
 Amblypsilopus albipes (Becker, 1922)
 Amblypsilopus albisignatus Bickel, 1994
 Amblypsilopus aliciensis Bickel, 1994
 Amblypsilopus alipatei Bickel, 2009
 Amblypsilopus alter (Becker, 1922)
 Amblypsilopus ambila Grichanov, 2004
 Amblypsilopus ambrym Bickel, 2006
 Amblypsilopus amnoni Bickel, 2019
 Amblypsilopus ampliatus Yang, 1995
 Amblypsilopus analamazaotra Grichanov, 2021
 Amblypsilopus ancistroides Yang, 1995
 Amblypsilopus andasibensis Grichanov, 2021
 Amblypsilopus angustatus (Aldrich, 1893)
 Amblypsilopus angustifrons (Parent, 1929)
 Amblypsilopus ankarana Grichanov, 2021
 Amblypsilopus ankaratrensis Grichanov, 1999
 Amblypsilopus annanensis Bickel, 1994
 Amblypsilopus anomalicornis (Becker, 1922)
 Amblypsilopus antennatus (Becker, 1922)
 Amblypsilopus apicalis Wang, Zhu & Yang, 2012
 Amblypsilopus arboreus Bickel, 1994
 Amblypsilopus arenarius Bickel, 2009
 Amblypsilopus argyrodendron Bickel, 1994
 Amblypsilopus armiger (Van Duzee, 1931)
 Amblypsilopus asau Bickel, 2009
 Amblypsilopus augustus Bickel, 1994
 Amblypsilopus auratus (Curran, 1924)
 Amblypsilopus aurichalceus (Becker, 1922)
 Amblypsilopus austerus (Parent, 1935)
 Amblypsilopus babindensis Bickel, 1994
 Amblypsilopus bairae Grichanov, 2021
 Amblypsilopus baoshanus Yang, 1998
 Amblypsilopus barkalovi Grichanov, 1998
 Amblypsilopus baroalba Bickel, 1994
 Amblypsilopus basalis Yang, 1997
 Amblypsilopus basilewskyi (Vanschuytbroeck, 1960)
 Amblypsilopus basistylatus (Parent, 1939)
 Amblypsilopus basseti Bickel, 1994
 Amblypsilopus bataviensis Bickel, 1994
 Amblypsilopus batilamu Bickel, 2009
 Amblypsilopus belauensis Bickel, 1994
 Amblypsilopus bellimanus (Van Duzee, 1927)
 Amblypsilopus bereni Bickel, 1994
 Amblypsilopus bertiensis Bickel, 1994
 Amblypsilopus bevisi (Curran, 1927)
 Amblypsilopus bezzii Bickel, 2006
 Amblypsilopus bicolor (Loew, 1861)
 Amblypsilopus bilobus (Van Duzee, 1929)
 Amblypsilopus bimestris Bickel, 1994
 Amblypsilopus bimus Bickel, 1994
 Amblypsilopus bipectinatus (Parent, 1934)
 Amblypsilopus biprovincialis Bickel, 1994
 Amblypsilopus birraduk Bickel, 1994
 Amblypsilopus bonniae (Irwin, 1974)
 Amblypsilopus borroloola Bickel, 1994
 Amblypsilopus bouvieri (Parent, 1927)
 Amblypsilopus bractus Bickel & Wei, 1996
 Amblypsilopus bradleii (Van Duzee, 1915)
 Amblypsilopus bredini (Robinson, 1975)
 Amblypsilopus brevitibia Bickel, 1994
 Amblypsilopus brorstromae Bickel, 2009
 Amblypsilopus bruneli Grichanov, 1998
 Amblypsilopus byrnei Bickel, 1994
 Amblypsilopus cahillensis Bickel, 1994
 Amblypsilopus cakaudrove Bickel, 2009
 Amblypsilopus californicus (Steyskal, 1966)
 Amblypsilopus callainus Bickel, 1994
 Amblypsilopus canungra Bickel, 1994
 Amblypsilopus capillimanus (Enderlein, 1912)
 Amblypsilopus capitatus Yang, 1997
 Amblypsilopus careelensis Bickel, 1994
 Amblypsilopus castus (Loew, 1866)
 Amblypsilopus centralis (Becker, 1923)
 Amblypsilopus cephalodinus Yang, 1998
 Amblypsilopus cilicostatus (Van Duzee, 1927)
 Amblypsilopus cilifrons (Parent, 1937)
 Amblypsilopus ciliipennis (Aldrich, 1901)
 Amblypsilopus cincinnatus Bickel, 1994
 Amblypsilopus cobourgensis Bickel, 1994
 Amblypsilopus commoni Bickel, 1994
 Amblypsilopus cooki Bickel, 1994
 Amblypsilopus coronatus Yang & Yang, 2003
 Amblypsilopus cosmochirus (Bezzi, 1928)
 Amblypsilopus costalis (Aldrich, 1904)
 Amblypsilopus crassatus Yang, 1997
 Amblypsilopus cursus Bickel, 1994
 Amblypsilopus curvus Liu, Zhu & Yang, 2012
 Amblypsilopus cuthbertsoni (Parent, 1937)
 Amblypsilopus cyplus Bickel, 1994
 Amblypsilopus dallastai Grichanov, 1998
 Amblypsilopus decoratus (Becker, 1922)
 Amblypsilopus decoripes (Robinson, 1975)
 Amblypsilopus delectabilis (Parent, 1932)
 Amblypsilopus depilis Bickel & Sinclair, 1997
 Amblypsilopus dequierosi Bickel, 2009
 Amblypsilopus didymus Yang, 1997
 Amblypsilopus digitatus Wang, Zhu, Yang, 2012
 Amblypsilopus dimidiatus (Loew, 1862)
 Amblypsilopus disjunctus (Parent, 1936)
 Amblypsilopus dominicensis (Robinson, 1975)
 Amblypsilopus donhi Bickel, 1994
 Amblypsilopus dorsalis (Loew, 1866)
 Amblypsilopus edwardsi Bickel, 1994
 Amblypsilopus elaquarae Bickel, 2009
 Amblypsilopus elatus Bickel, 2009
 Amblypsilopus elegans (Walker, 1852)
 Amblypsilopus ellisi (Hollis, 1964)
 Amblypsilopus eotrogon Bickel, 1994
 Amblypsilopus eupulvillatus (Parent, 1928)
 Amblypsilopus exul (Parent, 1932)
 Amblypsilopus falcatus (Becker, 1922)
 Amblypsilopus fasciatus (Curran, 1924)
 Amblypsilopus fianarantsoa Grichanov, 2021
 Amblypsilopus filitarsis (Parent, 1935)
 Amblypsilopus flabellifer (Becker, 1923)
 Amblypsilopus flagellaris (Frey, 1925)
 Amblypsilopus flavellus Wang, Zhu & Yang, 2012
 Amblypsilopus flaviappendiculatus (De Meijere, 1910)
 Amblypsilopus flavicercus Zhu & Yang, 2011
 Amblypsilopus flavicornis (Aldrich, 1896)
 Amblypsilopus flavidus (Aldrich, 1896)
 Amblypsilopus flavipes (De Meijere, 1910)
 Amblypsilopus flavus (Vanschuytbroeck, 1962)
 Amblypsilopus floridanus (Harmston, 1971)
 Amblypsilopus fonsecai Bickel, 1994
 Amblypsilopus fonticolus Bickel, 1994
 Amblypsilopus fortescuia Bickel, 1994
 Amblypsilopus freidbergi Grichanov, 2021
 Amblypsilopus friedmani Grichanov, 2021
 Amblypsilopus fruticosus (Becker, 1922)
 Amblypsilopus fuscinervis (Van Duzee, 1926)
 Amblypsilopus fustis Bickel, 1994
 Amblypsilopus gabonensis Grichanov, 2022
 Amblypsilopus gapensis Bickel, 1994
 Amblypsilopus gilvipes (Enderlein, 1912)
 Amblypsilopus glaciunguis Bickel, 1994
 Amblypsilopus gnathoura Bickel, 2009
 Amblypsilopus gorodkovi Grichanov, 1996
 Amblypsilopus gracilitarsis (De Meijere, 1914)
 Amblypsilopus graciliventris (Parent, 1933)
 Amblypsilopus grallator (Frey, 1924)
 Amblypsilopus gravipes (Becker, 1922)
 Amblypsilopus gressitti Bickel, 1994
 Amblypsilopus grootaerti Grichanov, 1998
 Amblypsilopus guangxiensis Yang, 1998
 Amblypsilopus guntheri Bickel, 1994
 Amblypsilopus hainanensis Bickel & Wei, 1996
 Amblypsilopus henanensis Yang & Saigusa, 2000
 Amblypsilopus honiarensis Bickel, 2009
 Amblypsilopus hubeiensis Yang & Yang, 1997
 Amblypsilopus humilis (Becker, 1922)
 Amblypsilopus ialibu Bickel, 2019
 Amblypsilopus ibiscorum Bickel, 2009
 Amblypsilopus ibiscorum Bickel, 2019 (homonym of previous)
 Amblypsilopus ignobilis (Becker, 1922)
 Amblypsilopus imitans (Becker, 1922)
 Amblypsilopus inaequalis (Van Duzee, 1927)
 Amblypsilopus infans (Becker, 1922)
 Amblypsilopus infumatus (Aldrich, 1901)
 Amblypsilopus insensibile (Yang, 1995)
 Amblypsilopus interdictus (Becker, 1922)
 Amblypsilopus josephi Meuffels & Grootaert, 1999
 Amblypsilopus julius Bickel, 1994
 Amblypsilopus jullatensis Bickel, 1994
 Amblypsilopus kaindi Bickel, 2019
 Amblypsilopus kakaduensis Bickel, 1994
 Amblypsilopus kaplanae Grichanov, 1999
 Amblypsilopus kaputar Bickel, 1994
 Amblypsilopus kilaka Bickel, 2009
 Amblypsilopus knorri Grichanov, 1999
 Amblypsilopus korotyaevi Grichanov, 2021
 Amblypsilopus kotoi Bickel, 2009
 Amblypsilopus kraussi Grichanov, 1998
 Amblypsilopus lacduonganus Li, Li & Yang, 2013
 Amblypsilopus lakeba Bickel, 2009
 Amblypsilopus latifacies (Van Duzee, 1934)
 Amblypsilopus latilamellatus (Parent, 1934)
 Amblypsilopus laui Bickel, 2009
 Amblypsilopus lenakel Bickel, 2006
 Amblypsilopus lenga (Curran, 1929)
 Amblypsilopus leonidi Grichanov, 2021
 Amblypsilopus leptopus Meuffels & Grootaert, 1999
 Amblypsilopus liangi Tang, Zhu & Yang, 2019
 Amblypsilopus liaoae Zhu & Yang, 2011
 Amblypsilopus liepae Bickel, 1994
 Amblypsilopus liratus Tang, Zhu & Yang, 2019
 Amblypsilopus lismorensis Bickel, 1994
 Amblypsilopus liui Zhu & Yang, 2011
 Amblypsilopus lobatus (De Meijere, 1916)
 Amblypsilopus longifilus (Becker, 1923)
 Amblypsilopus longipes (Van Duzee, 1929)
 Amblypsilopus longiseta Yang & Saigusa, 2000
 Amblypsilopus longus Li, Li & Yang, 2013
 Amblypsilopus longwanganus Yang, 1997
 Amblypsilopus loriensis Bickel, 1994
 Amblypsilopus luteus (Robinson, 1975)
 Amblypsilopus macula (Wiedemann, 1830)
 Amblypsilopus macularivena (Irwin, 1974)
 Amblypsilopus madagascariensis (Vanschuytbroeck, 1952)
 Amblypsilopus malensis Bickel, 1994
 Amblypsilopus marginatus Tang, Zhu & Yang, 2019
 Amblypsilopus marikai Bickel, 2009
 Amblypsilopus marinae Grichanov, 2021
 Amblypsilopus marskeae Runyon, 2020
 Amblypsilopus martini Grichanov, 2022
 Amblypsilopus maulevu Bickel, 2006
 Amblypsilopus medianus (Becker, 1922)
 Amblypsilopus medogensis Tang, Zhu & Yang, 2019
 Amblypsilopus medvedevi Grichanov, 1996
 Amblypsilopus megastoma Bickel, 2019
 Amblypsilopus melasma Bickel, 1994
 Amblypsilopus mensualis Bickel, 1994
 Amblypsilopus mexicanus (Aldrich, 1901)
 Amblypsilopus milleri Grichanov, 2022
 Amblypsilopus miser (Parent, 1935)
 Amblypsilopus moggillensis Bickel, 1994
 Amblypsilopus mollis (Parent, 1932)
 †Amblypsilopus monicae Bickel in Bickel & Kraemer, 2016
 Amblypsilopus montanorum Bickel, 1994
 Amblypsilopus mufindiensis Grichanov, 2022
 Amblypsilopus munroi (Curran, 1924)
 Amblypsilopus mutandus (Becker, 1922)
 Amblypsilopus mutatus (Becker, 1922)
 Amblypsilopus nambourensis Bickel, 1994
 Amblypsilopus nanus (Parent, 1929)
 Amblypsilopus nartshukae Grichanov, 1996
 Amblypsilopus natalis Bickel, 1994
 Amblypsilopus navatadoi Bickel, 2009
 Amblypsilopus navukailagi Bickel, 2009
 Amblypsilopus neoparvus (Dyte, 1975)
 Amblypsilopus neoplatypus Bickel, 1994
 Amblypsilopus nigricercus Zhu & Yang, 2011
 Amblypsilopus nigrimanus (Van Duzee, 1914)
 Amblypsilopus nimbuwah Bickel, 1994
 Amblypsilopus niphas Bickel, 2009
 Amblypsilopus niupani Bickel, 2009
 Amblypsilopus nivanuatorum Bickel, 2009
 Amblypsilopus noditarsis (Becker, 1922)
 Amblypsilopus okapa Bickel, 2019
 Amblypsilopus olgae Grichanov, 2021
 Amblypsilopus olsoni Bickel, 2009
 Amblypsilopus oscillans (Parent, 1935)
 Amblypsilopus pallidicornis (Grimshaw, 1901)
 Amblypsilopus pallidus (De Meijere, 1910)
 Amblypsilopus papaveroi (Milward de Azevedo, 1986)
 Amblypsilopus papillifer Bickel, 1994
 Amblypsilopus paramonovi Bickel, 1994
 Amblypsilopus parrai (Milward de Azevedo, 1985)
 Amblypsilopus parvus (Van Duzee, 1933)
 Amblypsilopus pascali Bickel, 2019
 Amblypsilopus pectinatus (De Meijere, 1910)
 Amblypsilopus pectoralis (De Meijere, 1913)
 Amblypsilopus pediformis (Becker, 1922)
 Amblypsilopus penaoru Bickel, 2009
 Amblypsilopus penicillatus (Becker, 1922)
 Amblypsilopus perniger (Becker, 1923)
 Amblypsilopus pilosus (Negrobov, 1979)
 Amblypsilopus planipes (Van Duzee, 1929)
 Amblypsilopus pollinosus (Van Duzee, 1915)
 Amblypsilopus ponapensis Bickel, 1994
 Amblypsilopus praecipuus (Milward de Azevedo, 1985)
 Amblypsilopus prysjonesi (Meuffels & Grootaert, 2007)
 Amblypsilopus pseudexul Bickel, 1994
 Amblypsilopus psittacinus (Loew, 1861)
 Amblypsilopus pulverulentus (Parent, 1939)
 Amblypsilopus pulvillatus (Bezzi, 1928)
 Amblypsilopus pusillus (Macquart, 1842)
 Amblypsilopus putealis Bickel, 1994
 Amblypsilopus qaraui Bickel, 2009
 Amblypsilopus qianensis Wei & Song, 2005
 Amblypsilopus qinlingensis Yang & Saigusa, 2005
 Amblypsilopus quinquepetalus Tang, Zhu & Yang, 2019
 Amblypsilopus quldensis Bickel, 1994
 Amblypsilopus raculei Bickel, 2009
 Amblypsilopus ranomafana Grichanov, 2004
 Amblypsilopus ratawai Bickel, 2009
 Amblypsilopus renschi (Parent, 1932)
 Amblypsilopus rentzi Bickel, 1994
 Amblypsilopus retrovena (Irwin, 1974)
 Amblypsilopus reunionensis Grichanov, 2004
 Amblypsilopus rezendei (Milward de Azevedo, 1985)
 Amblypsilopus rimbija Bickel, 1994
 Amblypsilopus riuensis Bickel, 2019
 Amblypsilopus romani Grichanov, 2021
 Amblypsilopus rosaceus (Wiedemann, 1824)
 Amblypsilopus rotundiceps (Aldrich, 1904)
 Amblypsilopus ruchini Grichanov, 2021
 Amblypsilopus sabroskyi Bickel, 1994
 Amblypsilopus sanjanae Bickel, 2009
 Amblypsilopus sanyanus Yang, 1998
 Amblypsilopus scintillans (Loew, 1861)
 Amblypsilopus septentrionalis Bickel, 1994
 Amblypsilopus seticoxa (De Meijere, 1914)
 Amblypsilopus setosus Zhu & Yang, 2011
 Amblypsilopus sichuanensis Yang, 1997
 Amblypsilopus sideroros Bickel, 1994
 Amblypsilopus signatus (Becker, 1923)
 Amblypsilopus simplex (De Meijere, 1910)
 Amblypsilopus sounwari Bickel, 2009
 Amblypsilopus spiniscapus Grichanov, 2022
 Amblypsilopus steelei Grichanov, 1996
 Amblypsilopus striaticollis (Becker, 1922)
 Amblypsilopus stuckenbergi (Vanschuytbroeck, 1957)
 Amblypsilopus stuckenbergorum (Irwin, 1974)
 Amblypsilopus subabruptus Bickel & Wei, 1996
 Amblypsilopus subtilis (Becker, 1924)
 Amblypsilopus superans (Walker, 1860)
 Amblypsilopus svenhedini (Parent, 1936)
 Amblypsilopus takamaka Grichanov, 2004
 Amblypsilopus tenuicauda (Parent, 1936)
 Amblypsilopus tenuipes (Becker, 1922)
 Amblypsilopus tenuitarsis (De Meijere, 1913)
 Amblypsilopus terriae Bickel, 2009
 Amblypsilopus tinarooensis Bickel, 1994
 Amblypsilopus topendensis Bickel, 1994
 Amblypsilopus tortus Bickel, 1994
 Amblypsilopus tozerensis Bickel, 1994
 Amblypsilopus trahens (Frey, 1925)
 Amblypsilopus triduum Bickel, 1994
 Amblypsilopus triscuticatus (Hardy, 1930)
 Amblypsilopus trogon Bickel, 1994
 Amblypsilopus trudis Bickel, 1994
 Amblypsilopus trukensis Bickel, 1994
 Amblypsilopus turbidus (Becker, 1922)
 Amblypsilopus turcicus Tonguc & Grootaert, 2013
 Amblypsilopus udzungwensis Grichanov, 2022
 Amblypsilopus uneorum Bickel, 1994
 Amblypsilopus ungulatus (Parent, 1941)
 Amblypsilopus unicinctus (Van Duzee, 1927)
 Amblypsilopus unicoiensis (Robinson, 1964)
 Amblypsilopus unifasciatus (Say, 1823)
 Amblypsilopus upolu Bickel, 2006
 Amblypsilopus uptoni Bickel, 1994
 Amblypsilopus variabilis (De Meijere, 1913)
 Amblypsilopus variegatus (Loew, 1861)
 Amblypsilopus variipes (Frey, 1925)
 Amblypsilopus veisari Bickel, 2009
 Amblypsilopus ventralis Wang, Zhu & Yang, 2012
 Amblypsilopus volivoli Bickel, 2006
 Amblypsilopus vusasivo Bickel, 2009
 Amblypsilopus waiseai Bickel, 2006
 Amblypsilopus waivudawa Bickel, 2009
 Amblypsilopus walkeri Bickel, 1994
 Amblypsilopus waqai Bickel, 2009
 Amblypsilopus webbensis Bickel, 1994
 Amblypsilopus weii Grichanov, 1999
 Amblypsilopus wellsae Bickel, 1994
 Amblypsilopus williamsi Bickel, 1994
 Amblypsilopus wokoensis Bickel, 1994
 Amblypsilopus wolffi Bickel, 2009
 Amblypsilopus wongabelensis Bickel, 1994
 Amblypsilopus xizangensis Yang, 1998
 Amblypsilopus yunnanensis Yang, 1998
 Amblypsilopus zhejiangensis Yang, 1997
 Amblypsilopus zonatus (Parent, 1932)
 Amblypsilopus zucchii (Milward de Azevedo, 1885)

Unrecognised species:
 Amblypsilopus brunnescens (Becker, 1922)
 Amblypsilopus oldroydi (Haider, 1957)
 Amblypsilopus parallelinervis (Parent, 1935)
 Amblypsilopus parvulus (Parent, 1934)
 Amblypsilopus segnis (Parent, 1934)
 Amblypsilopus soror (Parent, 1934)

Species considered nomina dubia:
 Amblypsilopus flavicollis (Becker, 1923)
 Amblypsilopus rectangularis (Parent, 1937)
 Amblypsilopus sudanensis (Parent, 1939)
 Amblypsilopus tropicalis (Parent, 1933)

Species transferred to Chrysosoma:
 Amblypsilopus subfascipennis (Curran, 1926)

Species that are now synonyms:
 Amblypsilopus asper (Parent, 1933): synonym of Amblypsilopus bevisi (Curran, 1927)
 Amblypsilopus janatus (Negrobov, 1984): synonym of Amblypsilopus pilosus (Negrobov, 1979)
 Amblypsilopus sinensis Yang & Yang, 2003: synonym of Amblypsilopus subabruptus Bickel & Wei, 1996

References 

Dolichopodidae genera
Sciapodinae
Taxa named by Jacques-Marie-Frangile Bigot
Insects described in 1888
Diptera of Asia
Diptera of Africa
Diptera of Australasia
Diptera of North America
Diptera of South America